The NatWest Staff Association (NWSA) was a trade union representing staff at the National Westminster Bank in the United Kingdom.

The union was founded in 1969 as the National Westminster Staff Association with the merger of the National Provincial Bank and the Westminster Bank to form the National Westminster Bank. It was a union of the National Provincial Staff Association, National Provincial Bank Ladies' Guild, District Bank Staff Association and the Westminster Bank Guild.  By 1980, it had nearly 34,000 members.

In 1999, the union merged with the Banking, Insurance and Finance Union and the Barclays Group Staff Union to form UNIFI.  Some former members of the NatWest Staff Association disagreed with the merger and instead joined the Amalgamated Engineering and Electrical Union.

References

External links
Catalogue of the NWSA archives, held at the Modern Records Centre, University of Warwick

Finance sector trade unions
Defunct trade unions of the United Kingdom
Trade unions established in 1969
Trade unions disestablished in 1999
Trade unions based in Dorset
NatWest Group